Cadaqués is a town in the Alt Empordà comarca, in the province of Girona,  Catalonia, Spain. It is on a bay in the middle of the Cap de Creus peninsula, near Cap de Creus cape, on the Costa Brava of the Mediterranean. It is two-and-a-quarter-hour drive from Barcelona, and thus it is accessible not only to tourists but also to people who want a second home for weekends and summers. In 2002, Cadaqués had an official population of 2,612, but up to ten times as many people can live in the town during the peak of the summer tourism season.

Cadaqués has a special place in art history. Commanding charcoals, by local artist Eliseu Meifrèn, of the 19th century Cadaqués beleaguered by a winter tramontane, can be seen at the Cadaqués museum. Fren was the first modern artist to live in Cadaqués and gave the town many of his works and a marble top table on which he sketched many of its turn-of-the-century fishermen.

Salvador Dalí often visited Cadaqués in his childhood, and later kept a home in Port Lligat, a small village on a bay next to the town. A summer holiday here in 1916, spent with the family of Ramon Pichot is seen as especially important to Dalí's artistic career. Other notable artists, including Pablo Picasso, Joan Miró, Marcel Duchamp, Richard Hamilton, Albert Ràfols-Casamada, Antoni Pitxot, Henri-François Rey, Melina Mercouri and Maurice Boitel also spent time here. Cadaqués is mentioned in the story "Tramontana" by Gabriel García Márquez.

The interesting submarine life of this sleepy fishing village was studied for several years by phycologist Françoise Ardré, long before Cadaqués was discovered and transformed into a tourism destination. On Mondays there is a travelling market in Cadaqués, located near the parking lot. This market has a wide variety of products.

History

Relationship with Cuba 

In the early 20th century a large number of inhabitants of Cadaqués travelled or emigrated to Cuba (the figure has been estimated as one third of a village of approximately 1200 people). Many of these immigrants were financially successful in Cuba and returned to Cadaqués where they constructed large and ornate houses. These houses can still be seen in the town (for example; the "Casa Blava", "Blue House" in English). A person returned from Cuba was referred to as an "Americano" among other names.

Traditions 
Women of the village traditionally fetched water using a glazed earthenware jug called a "doll". The colour of the glazing was green. Similar earthenware can still be seen used as decorations. A number of photos exist showing women carrying these "dolls" on their heads (covered with a protective cloth).

Owing to Cadaqués's proximity to the French border and its isolation by land, the village had a tradition of running contraband. See the writings of Josep Pla.

People 

 Pablo Picasso stayed during the summer of 1910, was also a guest of the family Pitxot
 Joan Miró
 José Antonio Coderch (1913–1984) prominent post-war Barcelona-born architect
 Marcel Duchamp played chess in the cafe "Meliton" with John Cage amongst others. According to Richard Hamilton, Duchamp regarded the local fishermen as strong chess players.
 Antoni Pitxot
 René Magritte
 Walt Disney
 Melina Mercouri
 Robert Venosa American visionary artist
 Maurice Boitel
 Eugeni d'Ors Catalan writer, wrote the "Ben Plantada" (the "Good Looking Girl")
 Josep Pla Catalan writer, wrote a number of books set in or about Cadaqués. see below
 Salvador Dalí built a house in Port lligat. Dalí's parents also had a house near the beach.
 Genia Chef Russian artist. His Madonna de la Esparanza hangs in the town's baroque Iglesia de Santa Maria
 Michael Lederer American author of the novel "Cadaqués"
 Federico García Lorca Spanish poet and dramatist
 André Breton French writer, poet, surrealist
 David Martí Catalan artist and writer
 Niki de Saint Phalle French artist, was invited or came to visit Marcel Duchamp
 Man Ray American artist, invited by Marcel Duchamp
 Mary Callery sculptor
 Dieter Roth artist
 Marcel Broodthaers
 Richard Hamilton (artist) English artist, invited by Marcel Duchamp
 John Cage composer, invited by Duchamp with whom he played chess
 Jean Tinguely collaborator with Niki de Saint-Phalle
 James Mason actor, filmed near Cadaqués
 Pablo Casals cellist, invited by the family Pitxot
 André Derain painter, invited by the family Pitxot; painted the village in 1910
 Raoul Pugno
 Jacint Morera Catalan painter
 Maria Martins Brazilian surrealist sculptrice
 Damien Rice
 Jordi Pagans i Monsalvatje Catalan painter
 Terence Weil cellist
 Luis Aznarez Musician

Language 

Even though people speak Spanish the village of Cadaqués has its own variant or dialect of the Catalan language. One of the most notable features is that the definite articles are different from standard Catalan, namely, they are "sa" (feminine) and "es" masculine instead of the normal Catalan definite articles "la" and "el". This feature is shared with the variant of Catalan spoken in the Balearic Islands. The explanation for this (see "El Vocabulari de Cadaqués", Ernesta Sala i Bruses) is that when the Catalan ruler Jaume I conquered the Balearic Islands in the Middle Ages he re-colonized the islands with people from the Empordà region of Catalonia. Because Cadaqués has remained relatively isolated from the surrounding region (owing to its geography), the mediaeval speech patterns have been preserved.

Another aspect of the speech variant of Cadaqués is the alteration of the first person singular of certain verbs: conjugations that normally end in "o" end in "i" in the Cadaqués variant. For example, "a vegades agafi molt per Cala Nans" (informant was an approximately 90-year-old fisherman). In standard Catalan this would be "a vegades agafo molt per Cala Nans" (meaning: sometimes I catch a lot at Cala Nans) The speech variant of Catalan has most similarities with the Catalan spoken in Ibiza (Balearic Islands).

The Catalan variant of Cadaqués is referred to as "cadaquesenc" by the local people and also has many lexical items.
Examples include:
 rastell: a street (normally with a steep slope) which is formed with pieces of slate stone placed in a vertical position. These types of streets are very characteristic of the streets of Cadaqués.
 grop: a black rain cloud
 llagut: a small boat
 talaia: an elevated castle or look-out which could warn the village of danger or transmit other signals (example: approaching ships) – compare with the "talaiots" of Menorca.
 xarxi: a (fishing) net, as opposed to "xarxa" in standard Catalan
  Norai: a stone cylindrical building with a large stone on the top that fishermen used to attach their boats.

Tourism

Main sights 
 Salvador Dalí House-Museum
 Church of St. Mary (late-17th century) is the church that most stands out in the views of the town.
 Hermitage of Sant Sebastià, a large house located high on Pení Mountain behind Cadaqués. It is a private residence not open to the public. The hermitage is surrounded by cork trees, and is built on a steep slope.
 Natural Park of Cap de Creus and the lighthouse located at the most easterly point on the mainland of Spain and the Iberian peninsula.

Hiking 
The GR 92 long distance footpath, which roughly follows the length of the Mediterranean coast of Spain, has a staging point at Cadaqués.

Geology 

Cadaqués and the surrounding peninsula known as the Cap de Creus owes its beauty in part to its complex geology. The rocks here were pushed up when the Pyrenees were formed, and are mostly metamorphic schists which turn a golden colour in the Mediterranean sun.

Add to that the weather: this is one of the wildest spots on the Costa Brava in the winter (Costa Brava means "wild coast"), so the migmatites and schists are battered and eroded by the Tramuntana wind which whips off the mountains and by a sea that appears as if it is boiling in the force 8 winds.

The Cadaqués migmatites formed under extreme pressure and temperatures: a partial melt. They are halfway between an igneous and metamorphic rock. The area also contains a lot of schist: a medium grade metamorphic rock that has been flattened into sheets. White blocks of pegmatite mark where molten rock was squeezed through the older metamorphics at the end of the orogeny or mountain building.

The geological history has been exposed by erosion from wind and sea, and many geologists have mapped the area for this reason.

Chinese replica 
The replica village is projected to house some 15,000 Chinese holidaymakers. Building is reported to begin in September or October 2010.

References

Sources 
 Galeria Cadaqués, obres de la collecció Bombelli. . (MACBA 2006) in Catalan
 El Cadaqués de Peter Harnden i Lanfronco Bombelli. . Col·legi d'Arquitectes de Catalunya
 El Vocabulari de Cadaqués. , Ernesta sala, Parsifal Edicions, written in Catalan
 Cadaqués. Josep Pla. . This book is available in Catalan and Spanish.
 Contraband. Josep Pla.  About experiences Pla had in running small-time contraband from Cadaqués.

External links 

 
 Cadaqués tourism
 English guide to Cadaqués
 Government data pages 
 International Photo Festival InCadaqués

Municipalities in Alt Empordà
Populated places in Alt Empordà
Articles containing video clips